The 2019 Eastern Asian Men's Volleyball Championship was the 10th edition of the AVC Eastern Zonal Men's Volleyball Championship, the volleyball championship of East Asia. It was held in Zhangjiagang, China from 16 to 21 July 2019.

On 21 July, China were the defending champions and won their second title. Yu Yuantai was elected the most valuable player.

Competing nations
The following national teams participated:

Venue

Round-Robin
 All times are China standard time (UTC+08:00).

|}

|}

Final standing

Awards
MVP:  Yu Yuantai
Best Coach:  Lu Weizhong

References

External links
 Official AVC website

East Asia Volleyball Championship
Asian Eastern Zonal
Asian Eastern Zonal
International volleyball competitions hosted by China
Asian Eastern Zonal Men's Volleyball Championship